Ninurta-apla-X was a 9th/8th century BC king of Babylon during the period of mixed dynasties known as the dynasty of E. The name as currently given is based upon a 1920s reading that is no longer supported by direct evidence as the document from which it was derived is now too badly damaged to discern the characters proposed.

Biography

His most recent predecessor known by name was Baba-aḫa-iddina, whose reign ended perhaps around twelve years earlier. During the interregnum there was no king for several years. The only records of events during this period come from the chronicles of the Assyrian eponym dating system. These record that Šamši-Adad V’s seventh campaign was against Babylonia. His successor, Adad-nirari III, initially campaigned in the west but during 802 BC the chronicle records “to the sea,” thought to be Sealand of southern Mesopotamia. In 795 and 794 BC he campaigned in Dēr. The Synchronistic History ended with his reign and records:

Ninurta-apla-X’s successor was the similarly obscure king, Marduk-bēl-zēri.

Inscriptions

References

8th-century BC Babylonian kings
8th-century BC rulers